The Romance of the White Hair Maiden is a Hong Kong television series adapted from Liang Yusheng's novel Baifa Monü Zhuan. The series was first broadcast on ATV in Hong Kong in 1986.

Cast
 Note: Some of the characters' names are in Cantonese romanisation.

Bonnie Ngai as Lin Ngai-seung
Savio Tsang as Cheuk Yat-hong
Chen Kuan-tai as Ngok Ming-or
Wong Jo-see as Tit San-wu
Amy Yip as Mang Chau-ha
Cheng Lui as Kam Tuk-yee
Lau Wan-fung as Shek Ho
Cheung Kam as Pak Man
Lau Siu-kwan as Kang Siu-nam
Kam Tung as Ngai Chung-yin
Willie Lau as Muk-yung Chung
Cheung Tsang as Tit Fei-lung
So Suk-ping as Muk Kau-neung
Tong Pan-cheung as Wong Chiu-hei
Cho Tat-wah as Taoist Pak-shek
Pau Hon-lam as Cheuk Chung-lin
Tam Nga-tik as Wan Hing-pong
Leung Ming as Hung Ting-bat
Lai Suen as Red Flower Devil Mother
Au Wing-hon as Chu Seung-lok
Ng Tsi-yin as Ho Ngok-wah
Ling Man-hoi as Yuen Sung-wan
Lee Ka-ling as Hak Ping-ting
Ting Ying as Madam Hak
Wong Wai as Chu Yau-hau

External links

Hong Kong wuxia television series
Works based on Baifa Monü Zhuan
Asia Television original programming
1986 Hong Kong television series debuts
Television series set in the Ming dynasty
Cantonese-language television shows
Television shows based on works by Liang Yusheng
Television series set in the 17th century